Fallin' for You may refer to:

"Fallin' for You" (Colbie Caillat song), 2009
"Fallin' for You" (Eva Avila song)
"Fallin' for You", a song by Heather Headley from This Is Who I Am

See also
Fallen For You (foaled 2009), a British Thoroughbred racehorse and broodmare
Falling for You (disambiguation)
Fall for You (disambiguation)